Llawnt is a village in Shropshire, England. The name comes from Middle Welsh, borrowing from the English 'lawn'. The meaning in this case is 'green' (named after a piece of green land in the centre of the village).

The village is located about a mile from the border between Shropshire and Powys, near Rhydycroesau, and approximately four miles west of Oswestry. Its location and its Welsh name shows that this was at one time part of Powys. This changed with the 16th-century Acts of Union, when the Lordship of Oswestry was given to Shropshire.

The River Morda flows past the village.

Villages in Shropshire